Betsy's Kindergarten Adventures is an American animated television series intended for young children. The show aired from January 12 to September 27, 2008 on PBS Kids.

Plot
The show follows a five-year old girl named Betsy as she starts out her school years. The series premiere shows Betsy facing the uncertainty of her first day of school and the adjustments she must make as she meets her new teacher and classmates, encounters unfamiliar rules and routines, and finds herself in an entirely new environment. Subsequent episodes show Betsy's excitement and sense of adventure as she adapts to the new experiences of kindergarten.

Characters
 Betsy (voiced by Daveigh Chase) is 5-year-old girl who is the title/main character of the show.
 Billy (voiced by Nancy Cartwright) who enjoys playing in the dirt and is Betsy's best friend.
 Scott (voiced by Richard Steven Horvitz) is a smart boy with glasses who is very interested in science.
 Molly (voiced by Vicki Lewis) is an elitist girl.
 Sarah (voiced by Cree Summer) is a girl who loves sports.
 Kenji (also voiced by Nancy Cartwright) is an intelligent boy who enjoys dancing.
 Maria (also voiced by Cree Summer) is a quiet girl who loves art.
 Newton (also voiced by Richard Steven Horvitz), who shares similar interests to Scott and Kenji.
 Mrs. O'Connor (voiced by Sally Struthers) is kindergarten teacher.
 Bus Driver Bob (voiced by Fred Willard) is a loyal bus driver.
 Mr. Richard Warner (voiced by Tom Bosley) is a principal at Lakeshore Elementary School.
 Kevin (also voiced by Nancy Cartwright) is Betsy's baby brother.
 Betsy's mother (voiced by Bess Armstrong) is a homemaker who takes care of her daughter Betsy and her baby son Kevin. She is a stay-at-home mother and does not seem to have any outside job as of yet or ever.
 Betsy's father (also voiced by Richard Steven Horvitz) is an airplane pilot who speaks to Betsy in "airplane-talk." He appears to be the family's sole breadwinner.
 Farmer Thomas Warner (also voiced by Tom Bosley), is Richard Warner's brother and the owner of Warner Farms.
 Gracie is Betsy's family's dog.
 Kitty is Betsy's family's cat.
 Sydney is a pet salamander that belongs to Mrs. O'Connor's kindergarten class.

Episodes

References

External links
 Internet Movie Data Base
 Toonarific Cartoons
 Common Sense Media
 TV Guide

2008 American television series debuts
2008 American television series endings
2000s American animated television series
2000s American children's television series
2000s preschool education television series
American children's animated adventure television series
American preschool education television series
Animated preschool education television series
Animated television series about children
Elementary school television series
English-language television shows
PBS Kids shows
PBS original programming